The Pierides Kition inscriptions are seven Phoenician inscriptions found in Kition by Demetrios Pierides in 1881 and acquired by the Louvre in 1885.

Concordance

References

Archaeological sites in Cyprus
Louvre
Phoenician inscriptions